= King of Stories =

Chinese magazine

King of Stories 故事大王
- Frequency: Monthly
- Founded: 1983
- First issue: January 1983
- Website: King of Stories
- ISSN: 1004-0099
- OCLC: 45741331

King of Stories or Story King (Chinese: 故事大王), also known as Gushi Dawang or King of Storytellers, official English title as Kingdom of Stories, is a Shanghai-based Chinese story magazine for elementary and junior high school students, founded by Shi Yanbing (施雁冰) in January 1983 in Shanghai.

== History ==
King of Stories was founded by Shi Yanbing in Shanghai in January 1983.

It is supervised by Shanghai Century Publishing Company Limited, sponsored by Juvenile & Children's Publishing House (少年儿童出版社), and edited and published by the Editorial Department of King of Stories.
